Penniless (Persian: Bi pooli) is a 2009 film by the Iranian director Hamid Nematollah. The script was written by Nematollah and Hadi Moghadamdoost, and the film was lensed by Alireza Zarrindast. Leila Hatami, Bahram Radan and Nader Fallah starred in the principal roles.

References

Iranian comedy-drama films
2009 films
Crystal Simorgh for Audience Choice of Best Film winners